British Korean or Korean British may refer to:
Koreans in the United Kingdom
British people in North Korea
British people in South Korea
North Korea–United Kingdom relations
South Korea–United Kingdom relations
Eurasian (mixed ancestry) people of Korean and British descent